The Haunting of Castle Kitay (German: Spuk auf Schloß Kitay) is a 1920 German silent drama film directed by Paul Legband and featuring Georg H. Schnell, Gustav Adolf Semler and Kurt Gerron. It marked the start of Gerron's career in feature films and he went on to be a popular screen comedian.

Cast
 Edward Eyseneck as 	Polizeileutnant Watson
 Kurt Gerron as 	Diener Flipp	
 Johanna Mund as 	Lady Kitay
 Josef Peterhans as Fürst
 Lilly Rodewald as 	Lady Falcestone
 Georg H. Schnell as 	Lord Kitay 
 Gustav Adolf Semler as 	Lord Falcestone

References

Bibliography
 Giesen, Rolf. The Nosferatu Story: The Seminal Horror Film, Its Predecessors and Its Enduring Legacy. McFarland, 2019.
 Kosta, Barbara. Willing Seduction: The Blue Angel, Marlene Dietrich, and Mass Culture. Berghahn Books, 2009.

External links

1920 films
Films of the Weimar Republic
German silent feature films
German drama films
Films directed by Paul Legband
1920 drama films
German black-and-white films
Silent drama films
1920s German films